Maanikka Thottil is a 1974 Indian Tamil-language film directed by P. Madhavan. The film stars Gemini Ganesan and K. R. Vijaya. It was released on 2 March 1974.

Plot 
Businessman Ramakrishnan and assistant professor Sarada are avowed bachelors. They marry, and Sarada gives birth to five daughters. The film revolves around the problems that Ramakrishnan and Sarada have to face as parents have when most of their daughters marry men of their own choice.

Cast 
 Gemini Ganesan
 K. R. Vijaya
 Shubha
 Nagesh
 V. K. Ramasamy
 Sivakumar
 Srikanth
 Vijayakumar
 Sarala
 Jayakumari
 Pakoda Kadhar

Production 
Maanikka Thottil was written and produced by Balamurugan under Karpagam Productions, and directed by P. Madhavan. Cinematography was handled by P. N. Sundaram.

Soundtrack 
The soundtrack was composed by M. S. Viswanathan, while the lyrics were written by Kannadasan.

Release 
Maanikka Thottil was released on 2 March 1974.

References

External links 
 

1970s Tamil-language films
Films scored by M. S. Viswanathan
Indian drama films
Films directed by P. Madhavan
1974 drama films